Pole is the artistic name of Stefan Betke (born 18 February 1967), a German electronic music artist commonly associated with the glitch genre as well as dubtronica.

History
Born in Düsseldorf, Pole took his name from a Waldorf 4-Pole filter, which he accidentally dropped and broke in 1996. Though the filter was perhaps no longer appropriate for DJ work in its damaged state, Betke found the strange hissing and popping noises the filter now made interesting sounds. He then began using the broken filter to create music, launching his musical career.

Betke's first four albums, titled 1, 2, 3, and R (an intentional trilogy of albums, followed by a collection of remixes of Pole's 1998 debut EP Raum), were all based around this filter, with songs usually taking the form of dub basslines and rhythms with percussion provided by the eponymous filter. In 2003 Betke departed from this style for the album Pole (a combination of tracks from two EPs, "45/45" and "90/90"), which utilized more traditionally electronic but still eclectic production.

Pole has been distributed on several different labels, including Matador Records and Mute Records, and in 1999 Betke cofounded (with Barbara Preisinger) the label ~scape, also known for publishing Jan Jelinek. On September 1, 2011, Betke founded a new artist label named Pole.

Betke mastered  John Frusciante's 2016 EP, Foregrow, and oversaw the 2019 re-master of Alphaville's 1984 album Forever Young and the 2021 re-master of 1986 album Afternoons in Utopia and 1989 album The Breathtaking Blue alongside Bernhard Lloyd.

Discography

Albums
 1 (1998)
 2 (1999)
 3 (2000)
 R (2001)
 Pole (2003)
 Steingarten (2007)
 Wald (2015)
 Fading (2020)
 Tempus (2022)

Singles
 Waldgeschichten (2011)
 Waldgeschichten 2 (2011)
 Waldgeschichten 3 (2012)

References

External links

Pole site at Matador Records
Pole biography at ~scape Records
[ Pole discography] at All Media Guide
Pole interview at The Milk Factory
Real Detroit Weekly Interview

German electronic musicians
Ambient musicians
Dubtronica musicians
Intelligent dance musicians
Mute Records artists
Matador Records artists
1967 births
Living people